Anfernee Jennings (born May 1, 1997) is an American football outside linebacker for the New England Patriots of the National Football League (NFL). He played college football at Alabama.

Early life and high school
Jennings grew up in Dadeville, Alabama and attended Dadeville High School, where he played defensive end and tight end for the Tigers. He made 171 tackles with seven sacks in his junior season and was named honorable mention Super All-State by AL.com. As a senior, Jennings was named first-team 4A All-State and the 4A Lineman of the Year after posting 170 tackles with 88 solo stops, 14 sacks, nine pass breakups and two forced fumbles. Rated a four-star recruit, Jennings committed to play college football at Alabama over offers from Arkansas, Arizona State, Georgia, Mississippi State and Nebraska.

College career
Jennings redshirted his true freshman season as he moved from defensive end to the outside linebacker position. He played as a key reserve as a redshirt freshman, finishing the year with 19 tackles (two for loss) and three quarterback hurries. Jennings became a starter during redshirt sophomore season and made 41 tackles, six for a loss, with one sack. Jennings suffered what was initially diagnosed to be a PCL injury in the final minutes of the 2018 Sugar Bowl against Clemson, causing him to miss the 2018 College Football Playoff National Championship Game. The injury was re-evaluated and Jennings was found to have also damaged an artery and developed a blood clot in his leg.

Jennings returned from his injury in time to begin his redshirt junior season. He finished the year with 51 tackles, including 14 for loss, 6.5 sacks, with an interception, a team-high 11 passes defended and two fumble recoveries (one of which was returned for his first career touchdown). Jennings entered his redshirt senior season on the Chuck Bednarik Award and Butkus Award watchlists and was named pre-season All-SEC and a second-team pre-season All-American by the Sporting News. Jennings had 83 tackles, 12.5 tackles for loss, 8.0 sacks, five pass breakups, one forced fumble and an interception and was named first-team All-SEC in his final season. Jennings finished his collegiate career with 194 tackles, 34.5 tackles for loss, 15.5 sacks, three forced fumbles, two interceptions and 20 passes defended in 54 games (38 starts).

Professional career 

In the 2020 NFL Draft, Jennings was drafted by the New England Patriots in the third round with the 87th overall pick. He made his NFL debut in the season opener on September 13, 2020, against the Miami Dolphins, playing nine snaps on defense in a 21–11 win. Jennings made his first career start on October 18, 2020, recording three tackles in a 18–12 loss to the Denver Broncos.

On August 31, 2021, Jennings was placed on injured reserve, ending his season.

Jennings entered the 2022 season as a backup linebacker. He played in 16 games with three starts, recording 27 tackles, 1.5 sacks, two passes defensed, and a forced fumble.

Personal life
Jennings' younger brother, Shawndarius "Shawn" Jennings, also plays college football and originally played at Alabama with Anfernee before transferring to South Alabama.

References

External links
Alabama Crimson Tide bio
New England Patriots bio

1997 births
Living people
Players of American football from Alabama
American football linebackers
Alabama Crimson Tide football players
People from Dadeville, Alabama
New England Patriots players
African-American players of American football
21st-century African-American sportspeople